The following is a list of notable alternative hip hop artists.

A

Abstract Rude
Cisco Adler
Aesop Rock
Akrobatik
Antipop Consortium
Anybody Killa
Arrested Development
Astronautalis
Atmosphere
Mickey Avalon

B

Basehead
Beans
Beastie Boys
Beat Junkies
Big Boi
The Black Eyed Peas
Black Sheep
Blackalicious
B.o.B
Brand Nubian
Danny Brown
Buck 65
Busdriver

C

Cadence Weapon
Calle 13
Cannibal Ox
La Caution
Chali 2na
Chance the Rapper
Chiddy Bang
Childish Gambino
Cities Aviv
Citizen King
Clouddead
The Cool Kids
Common
Company Flow
The Coup
Cypress Hill

D

Dälek
Dan the Automator
Danny!
Das Racist
DC Talk
De La Soul
Dead Prez
Death Grips
Del the Funky Homosapien
Deltron 3030
Die Antwoord
Digable Planets
Digital Underground
Dilated Peoples
The Disposable Heroes of Hiphoprisy
Divine Styler
Dolphin
Doomtree

E

Jay Electronica
El-P
Elwood
Epik High
Eyedea

F

Flobots
Flipsyde
Flying Lotus
Sage Francis
Freestyle Fellowship
Fugees
Fun Lovin' Criminals

G

G. Love & Special Sauce
Gang Starr
GDP
Ghostpoet
The Goats
Gnarls Barkley
Gorillaz
Grand Buffet
CeeLo Green
Greydon Square
Grieves
GRITS
Gym Class Heroes

H

Handsome Boy Modeling School
Hector Bizerk
Heems
Hieroglyphics

I

Ill Bill
Immortal Technique
Itch

J

Jamie T
Jneiro Jarel
JJ Doom
Jungle Brothers
Jurassic 5

K

K.Flay
Kid Cudi
Kid Koala
Kidz in the Hall
Killer Mike
Allan Kingdom
K'naan
Rockwell Knuckles
The Knux
k-os
Talib Kweli

L

Kendrick Lamar
Latyrx
Little Brother
Lupe Fiasco
Lyrics Born

M

Macklemore
Macklemore & Ryan Lewis
Matisyahu
Travie McCoy
Me Phi Me
MF Doom
M.I.A.
The Mighty Underdogs
Mac Miller
Milo
Pete Miser
Mr. Lif
Mos Def
Georgia Anne Muldrow
Murs

N

Nappy Roots
N.E.R.D
No I.D.
No Wyld

O

Odd Future
OK Cobra
One Block Radius
Open Mike Eagle
Organized Konfusion
Outasight
Outkast
Oxymorrons

P

Pac Div
People Under the Stairs
Pete Rock & CL Smooth
The Pharcyde
P.M. Dawn
P.O.S
Project Blowed

Q
Questlove

R

Ratking
RDGLDGRN
Reefer
Rehab
RJD2
The Roots
Run the Jewels

S

Thee Satisfaction
The Saturday Knights
Serengeti
Shabazz Palaces
Shad
Shape Shifters
Shwayze
Sisyphus
Slug
Sole
Son Lux
Souls of Mischief
SoulStice
Spank Rock
Spearhead
Speech
Earl Sweatshirt

T

Themselves
Theophilus London
A Tribe Called Quest
TTC
Twenty One Pilots
Tyga

Tyler, the Creator

U

Ugly Duckling
Us3

W

Gerald Walker
C-Rayz Walz
George Watsky
Ohmega Watts
Kanye West
Why?
will.i.am
Saul Williams
Yoni Wolf

Y
Young Fathers

Z

Zebra Katz
Zion I

See also

List of hip hop musicians
:Category:Alternative hip hop musicians

References

Bibliography

 
Alternative hip hop